This article lists tunnels in Bulgaria by type.

Railway tunnels 
It does not include planned, abandoned, or unfinished tunnels. The tunnels of the Sofia Metro are not included either.

Road tunnels 
It does not include tunnels under construction.

It was cancelled in 2015, before construction had begun, and it will be replaced with an alternative route featuring a number of smaller tunnels.

References and notes 

Bulgaria
 
Tunnels
Tunnels